The Twelfth Night Feast is a relatively large 1662 oil  painting by Jan Steen, now in the Museum of Fine Arts, Boston, which bought it in 1945. 

The picture depicts the Twelfth Night celebrations marking the end of the Christmas festivities and the beginning of Epiphany. It is the date when the Three Kings arrived at the stable in Bethlehem to pay homage to the newborn Jesus.

Here Steen depicts in his typical style the indoor celebrations in a well-to-do Dutch household. Children are playing on the floor with three candles symbolic of the three kings, whilst at the table, between the carousing adults, another boy offers a youngster dressed as a king a bite of his festival waffle.

References

1662 paintings
Paintings by Jan Steen
Paintings in the collection of the Museum of Fine Arts, Boston
Food and drink paintings
Dogs in art
Musical instruments in art